The Leopaard CS7 or Liebao CS7 is a subcompact SUV produced by Changfeng Motor of GAC Group under the Leopaard brand that was sold from 2009 to 2010.

Overview

Originally called the Leopaard Feiteng C5 (猎豹飞腾 C5), the Leopaard CS7 shares the same platform as the Leopaard Feiteng (猎豹飞腾) SUV which is essentially a rebadged Mitsubishi Pajero iO. The Leopaard CS7 or Leopaard Feiteng C5 body was restyled by Pininfarina. 

The Leopaard CS7 was introduced to the Chinese car market with prices ranging from 99,800 to 123,800 yuan. 

The Leopaard CS7 is powered by a lone 2.0 liter 4G94 inline-4 engine sourced from Mitsubishi producing 121hp, with the engine mated to a 5 speed manual transmission. The top speed of the Leopaard CS7 is 160km/hr

References

External links
Leopaard brand official website

Off-road vehicles
Compact sport utility vehicles
Rear-wheel-drive vehicles
All-wheel-drive vehicles
Pininfarina
Cars introduced in 2009
Changfeng Motor vehicles